The Fairchild F-27 and Fairchild Hiller FH-227 were versions of the Fokker F27 Friendship twin-engined, turboprop, passenger aircraft manufactured under license by Fairchild Hiller in the United States. The Fairchild F-27 was similar to the standard Fokker F27, while the FH-227 was an independently developed, stretched version.

Design and development

The Fokker F27 began life as a 1950 design study known as the P275, a 32-seater powered by two Rolls-Royce Dart turboprops. With the aid of Dutch government funding, the P275 evolved into the F27, which first flew on November 24, 1955. The first prototype was powered by Dart 507s and would have seated 28. To correct a slight tail heaviness and to allow for more seats, the second prototype (which first flew in January 1957) had a  fuselage, which allowed seating for 32.

By this stage, Fokker had signed an agreement that would have Fairchild build Friendships in the U.S. as the F-27. The first aircraft of either manufacturer to enter service in the U.S. was, in fact, a Fairchild-built F-27, with West Coast Airlines in September 1958.  Other Fairchild F-27 operators in the U.S. included Air South, Air West and successor Hughes Airwest, Allegheny Airlines, Aloha Airlines, Bonanza Air Lines, Horizon Air, Ozark Air Lines, Pacific Air Lines, Piedmont Airlines (1948-1989), Northern Consolidated Airlines, and successor Wien Air Alaska.  Fairchild subsequently manufactured a larger, stretched version of the F-27 named the Fairchild Hiller FH-227, which was operated by U.S.-based air carriers Delta Air Lines, Mohawk Airlines, Northeast Airlines, Ozark Air Lines, Piedmont Airlines (1948-1989),  and Wien Air Alaska.

Fairchild F-27s differed from the initial Fokker F27 Mk 100s in having basic seating for 40, heavier external skinning, a lengthened nose capable of housing weather radar, and additional fuel capacity. They also incorporated a passenger airstair door in the rear of the aircraft, operated by a flight attendant, which eliminated the need for separate stairs on the ground.

Developments were the F-27A with more powerful engines and the F-27B Combi aircraft version.  The F-27B Combi mixed passenger/freight version was operated in Alaska by Northern Consolidated Airlines and Wien Air Alaska.

Fairchild independently developed the stretched FH-227, which appeared almost two years earlier than Fokker's similar F27 Mk 500. The FH-227 featured a 1.83 m (6 ft) stretch over standard-length F27/F-27s, taking standard seating to 56, with a larger cargo area between the cockpit and the passenger cabin.

Production

In addition to the 581 F27s built by Fokker, 128 F-27s and 78 FH-227s were built. , only one Fairchild FH-227 aircraft, FH-227E serial number 501 belonging to the Myanmar Air Force, remained in active service.

Former operators 
(Source: Roach & Eastwood)

 
 Sahara Airlines (FH-227)

 
 CATA Linea Aerea (FH-227)

 Bahamasair (FH-227)

 
 Paraense Transportes Aereos (FH-227)
 TABA – Transportes Aereos da Bacia Amazonica (FH-227)
 VARIG (FH-227)

 
 Norcanair (F-27)
 Nordair (FH-227)
 Time Air (F-27)
 Quebecair (F-27)

 
 Aeronor Chile (FH-27A)

 
 Air Melanesie (F-27)
 Air Polynesie (F-27)
 TAT European Airlines (FH-227)

 
 Korean Air Lines (F-27, FH-227)

 
 Turkish Airlines (F-27)

 
 Airlift International (F-27, FH-227)
 Air New England (FH-227)
 AirPac (FH-227B) – Alaska-based air carrier
 Air South (F-27)
 Air West (subsequently renamed Hughes Airwest) – former Bonanza Air Lines, Pacific Air Lines and West Coast Airlines F-27 aircraft
 Allegheny Airlines (F-27)
 Aloha Airlines (F-27)
 Aspen Airways (F-27)
 Bonanza Air Lines (F-27)
 Connectair (F-27)
 Delta Air Lines (FH-227B) – former Northeast Airlines aircraft
 Empire Airlines (F-27)
 Horizon Air (F-27)
 Hughes Airwest (F-27) – former Air West aircraft
 Mohawk Airlines (FH-227)
 Northeast Airlines (FH-227)
 Northern Consolidated Airlines (F-27B combi aircraft) – merged with Wien Air Alaska
 Oceanair (F-27)
 Ozark Airlines (F-27, FH-227)
 Pacific Air Lines (F-27)
 Piedmont Airlines (1948–1989) (F-27, FH-227)
 Shawnee Airlines (FH-227)
 Southeast Airlines (F-27)
 West Coast Airlines (F-27)
 Wien Air Alaska (F-27B Combi aircraft) – Former Northern Consolidated Airlines aircraft that were capable of mixed passenger/cargo operations

 Uruguayan Air Force

 
 Avensa (F-27)

Notable accidents
Of the 78 FH-227s built, 23 crashed.
 On February 25, 1962, an Avensa F-27A crashed into a mountain on Margarita Island, killing all 23 on board.
 On November 15, 1964, Bonanza Air Lines Flight 114, flying from Phoenix, Arizona, to Las Vegas, Nevada, crashed into a mountain south of Las Vegas during poor weather.  No one survived among the 26 passengers and three crew on board.
 On March 10, 1967, West Coast Airlines Flight 720 crashed with four fatalities and no survivors near Klamath Falls, Oregon. The Fairchild F-27 was bound for Medford, Oregon, from Klamath Falls, and crashed due to ice accumulation on the aircraft.
 On August 10, 1968, Piedmont Airlines Flight 230 was on an ILS localizer-only approach to Charleston-Kanawha County Airport (CRW) runway 23 when it struck trees 360 feet from the runway threshold. The aircraft continued and struck up-sloping terrain short of the runway in a nose-down attitude. The aircraft continued up the hill and onto the airport, coming to rest 6 feet beyond the threshold and 50 feet from the right edge of the runway. A layer of dense fog was obscuring the runway threshold and about half of the approach lights. Visual conditions existed outside the fog area. All three crew members and 32 of the 34 passengers perished. The National Transportation Safety Board blamed the accident on an "unrecognized loss of altitude orientation during the final portion of an approach into shallow, dense fog." The disorientation was caused by a rapid reduction in the ground guidance segment available to the pilot at a point beyond which a go-around could be successfully effected.
 On October 25, 1968, Northeast Airlines Flight 946, an FH-227, crashed on Moose Mountain near Hanover, New Hampshire, on approach to Lebanon Municipal Airport. Of the 39 passengers and three crew on board, 32 were killed.
 On December 2, 1968, Wien Consolidated Airlines F-27B, N4905B, encountered severe to extreme turbulence near Pedro Bay, Alaska, resulting in separation of right wing and loss of all 39 on board. Pre-existing fatigue cracks contributed to wing failure. (NTSB DCA69A0006)
 On March 14, 1970, a Paraense Fairchild Hiller FH-227B registration PP-BUF operating flight 903 from São Luiz to Belém-Val de Cans, while on final approach to land at Belém, crashed into Guajará Bay. Of the 40 passengers and crew, three survived.
 On March 3, 1972, Mohawk Airlines Flight 405, a Fairchild Hiller FH-227, crashed into a house in Albany, New York, on approach to Albany County Airport. The crew had difficulty getting the cruise lock to disengage in one of the engines. While the crew attempted to deal with the problem, the aircraft crashed short of the airfield, killing 16 of the 48 people in the aircraft and one person on the ground. The lone surviving crew member was a stewardess, Sandra Quinn.
 On Friday, October 13, 1972, Uruguayan Air Force Flight 571, an FH-227D carrying 45 people, crashed in the Andes mountains. The pilot failed to account for headwinds in his transit time across the Andes and began his descent too soon. The event became known as the "Miracle in the Andes", and was the subject of the 1974 book Alive: The Story of the Andes Survivors and the 1993 film Alive.
 On July 23, 1973, Ozark Air Lines Flight 809 was operated by one of the company's Fairchild-Hiller FH-227's, registration N4215. The flight was scheduled to go from Nashville, Tennessee to St. Louis, Missouri, with four  intermediate stops. The segments to Clarksville, Paducah, Cape Girardeau, and Marion proceeded normally. Crashed in storm downdraft on final approach to St. Louis. 38 fatalities, 6 survivors.
 On August 8, 1975, Wien Air Alaska F-27B, N4904, crashed into mountain on approach in bad weather at Gambell, Alaska, killing 10 and seriously injuring 20.  (NTSB DCA76AZ004)
 On March 29, 1979, Québecair Flight 255, a Fairchild F-27, crashed after take-off, killing 17 and injuring seven.
 On January 24, 1980, a Burma Air Force FH-227 crashed due to engine failure shortly after take-off, killing all but one of the 44 people on board. One person on the ground was injured.
 On June 12, 1982, a TABA – Transportes Aéreos da Bacia Amazônica Fairchild Hiller FH-227 registration PT-LBV en route from Eirunepé to Tabatinga on approach to Tabatinga collided with a pole in poor visibility and crashed onto a parking lot. All 40 passengers and four crew died.
 On December 9, 1982, an Aeronor Chile F-27A was operating as Flight 304 on a scheduled domestic service from Santiago to La Serena, Chile. On final approach to La Serena's La Florida Airport, the aircraft stalled and crashed, bursting into flames on impact. All 42 passengers and four crew on board died.
 On March 4, 1988, a TAT European Airlines FH-227B operating a scheduled service from Nancy to Paris Orly as TAT Flight 230 crashed near Fontainebleau, France, killing all 23 occupants. An electrical malfunction during the start of the aircraft's descent had resulted in a sudden loss of control.
 On June 6, 1990, TABA Fairchild Hiller FH-227 registration PT-ICA flying from Belém-Val de Cans to Cuiabá via Altamira and other stops, while on approach under fog to land at Altamira, descended below the approach path, collided with trees, and crashed 850 m short of the runway. Of the 41 passengers and crew, 23 died.
 On January 25, 1993, TABA Fairchild Hiller FH-227, registration PT-LCS, operating a cargo flight from Belém-Val de Cans to Altamira crashed into the jungle near Altamira during night-time approach procedures. The crew of three died.
 On November 28, 1995, TABA Fairchild Hiller FH-227, registration PP-BUJ, operating a cargo flight from Belém-Val de Cans to Santarém crashed on its second attempt to approach Santarém. The crew of two and one of the passenger occupants died.

Specifications (FH-227E)

See also

References
Notes

Bibliography

External links

F-27
1960s United States airliners
Twin-turboprop tractor aircraft
High-wing aircraft
Aircraft first flown in 1958